Steve Giovinco is an American photographer. He created a hand-held large-format (8x8") camera in 1992.

Life and career

In the 1980s, Giovinco attended Yale University. In 1991 he had his first one-man exhibition, at the Kansas City Art Institute.

Collections
Steve Giovinco's work is in several museum collections, including the Brooklyn Museum; the Museum of Fine Arts, Houston; Butler Institute of Art, Youngstown, Ohio; California Museum of Photography, Riverside, California; Lowe Art Museum, Miami, Florida.

Exhibitions
 Myth of the Everyday, Fotogalerie Wien, Vienna, 2001. With Peter Freitag and Ursula Rogg.
 Myth of the Everyday, California Museum of Photography, Riverside, California, 2001.
 Photographs, Mednick Gallery, University of the Arts, Philadelphia, 2003.
 Home Show, Winnipeg Art Gallery, 2003. Group exhibition with Jeff Wall and Sam Taylor-Wood.
 Ambient Life, Velan Center, Turin, 2005.
 Eclipse: Recent Photographs, Jim Kempner Fine Art, New York City, 2007.
About Time: Contemporary Photographs, Jim Kempner Fine Art, New York City, 2010. With five other artists.
Edge of Darkness: Photographs by Steve Giovinco and Tim Simmons, Sheldon Art Gallery, St. Louis, 2012.
The Kids Are Alright, John Michael Kohler Arts Center, Sheboygan, Wisconsin, 2012, with Catherine Opie.
The Kids Are Alright, Weatherspoon Art Gallery, Greensboro, North Carolina, 2013, with Catherine Opie, Ryan McGinley.

References

Further reading 
 Conti, Tiziana. Tema Celeste, Issue 110, 2005, page 120.
 Finocchi, Daniela, "Steve Giovinco," Zoom, September–October 2005, pages 36–39.
 Leffingwell, Edward. Art in America, February 2008, page 145.
 Zoom, July/August 2007, page 62.

Living people
American photographers
Yale School of Art alumni
Fine art photographers
Year of birth missing (living people)